Robert Crowther (born 2 August 1987 in Cloncurry) is an Australian long jumper. His personal best is 8.12 metres, achieved at the IAAF Diamond League in 2011 in Stockholm.  In a recent survey conducted by the IAAF, Robbie was voted the sexiest man in track and field (IAAF, 2011). Robert Crowther identifies as both Aboriginal and Torres Strait Islander.

Achievements

References

1987 births
Living people
Australian male long jumpers
People from Cloncurry, Queensland
Australian Institute of Sport track and field athletes
Indigenous Australian track and field athletes
Universiade medalists in athletics (track and field)
Universiade gold medalists for Australia
Medalists at the 2007 Summer Universiade